The 49 delegates from Virginia to the Republican National Convention were allocated proportionally based on the popular vote. Donald Trump edged out a narrow plurality of pledged delegates, with Marco Rubio coming in second place and Ted Cruz placing in a distant third.

The Virginia Democratic presidential primary occurred on the same day.

Polling

Winner  Donald Trump
Primary date March 1, 2016

See also
 2016 Republican Party presidential primaries
 2016 United States presidential election

References

Virginia
2016 Virginia elections
Virginia Republican primaries